Dee Elbert Mackey (October 16, 1934February 26, 2001) was an American football tight end who played professionally for six seasons in the  National Football League and the American Football League. He played for the NFL's San Francisco 49ers (1960) and the Baltimore Colts (1961–1962). He played for the AFL's New York Jets (1963–1965).

He played college football at East Texas State and was a 24th round selection (287th overall pick) in the 1958 NFL Draft.

Personal
Dee Mackey's son Kyle also played football professionally in the NFL and the Arena Football League. Mackey's granddaughter, Molly Mackey, played NCAA Division I softball at the University of Louisiana at Monroe from 2014–2015.

Dee Mackey died at his home in Gladewater, Texas of a heart attack.

References

External links
 Profile from the 1964 Jets yearbook

1934 births
2001 deaths
People from Gilmer, Texas
American football tight ends
Tyler Apaches football players
Texas A&M–Commerce Lions football players
Texas A&M–Commerce Lions men's basketball players
San Francisco 49ers players
Baltimore Colts players
New York Jets players
American Football League players
People from Gladewater, Texas
American men's basketball players